Dale Schott is a Canadian animator, writer and storyboard artist, best known for directing the 1986 animated film Care Bears Movie II: A New Generation.<ref>{{cite web|last=Weagle|first=Gregory|url=http://cloudkicker.50webs.com/Info/tscrewtribute.htm|title=TaleSpin Crew Tribute|date=December 29, 2010|accessdate=July 27, 2011|publisher=Unofficial Kit Cloudckicker Homepage}}</ref>

Career
Over the years, Schott has served on various productions as an "animator, overseas animation supervisor, storyboard artist, director, writer and story editor". After graduating from the animation program at Ontario's Sheridan College in 1979, he started working at several studios, among them Toronto's Nelvana.  He was a "'junior' animator" on its TV special Take Me Up to the Ball Game, and its first feature, 1983's Rock & Rule.  He was a storyboard artist for the first season of the DIC television series, Inspector Gadget, which was produced at Nelvana as work-for-hire.

Schott also storyboarded 1985's The Care Bears Movie'', and made his directorial debut in the 1986 follow-up A New Generation.  Later on, he was also among the crew of Ewoks (a Nelvana/Lucasfilm collaboration), the original Babar series, and Rupert.

References

External links 
 

Living people
Year of birth missing (living people)
Film directors from Ontario
Canadian animated film directors
Canadian male screenwriters
Canadian storyboard artists
Canadian television directors
Canadian television writers
Canadian male television writers
Artists from Ontario
People from Norfolk County, Ontario
20th-century Canadian screenwriters
20th-century Canadian male writers